Joyce Renato Moreno Venecia (born 29 September 1974) is a Spanish retired footballer who played as a defender.

Club career
Moreno was born in Panama City. During his career the Real Madrid youth graduate (having appeared only for their reserves as a senior), represented Real Oviedo – appearing in 27 matches during the 1997–98 season in his first La Liga experience – CD Leganés, Burgos CF, RSD Alcalá, CD Badajoz, DAV Santa Ana, Granada CF and UE Sant Andreu.

Moreno made his debut in the Spanish top division on 7 September 1997, playing the full 90 minutes for Oviedo in a 3–3 away draw against Real Zaragoza. He retired in June 2008, aged 33.

Honours

Club
Granada
Tercera División: 2005–06

Country
Spain U17
FIFA U-17 World Cup: Runner-up 1991

References

External links

Granada official profile 

1974 births
Living people
Panamanian people of Spanish descent
Sportspeople from Panama City
Spanish footballers
Panamanian footballers
Association football defenders
La Liga players
Segunda División players
Segunda División B players
Tercera División players
Real Madrid Castilla footballers
Real Oviedo players
CD Leganés players
Burgos CF footballers
RSD Alcalá players
CD Badajoz players
Granada CF footballers
UE Sant Andreu footballers
Spain youth international footballers